Peabody is a city in Essex County, Massachusetts, United States. The population was 54,481 at the time of the 2020 United States Census. Peabody is located in the North Shore region of Massachusetts, and is known for its rich industrial history.

History

The area was long inhabited by Native American people known as the Naumkeag.

The area was settled as part of Salem in 1626 by a small group of English colonists from Cape Ann led by Roger Conant. It was subsequently referred to as the Northfields, Salem Farms, and Brooksby. Several area residents were accused of witchcraft during the Salem witch trials of the late 17th century, three of whom were executed (John Proctor, Giles Corey, and Martha Corey).

In 1752, the area was set off from Salem, and incorporated as a district of Danvers. It was referred to as "the South Parish", associated with a church located in present-day Peabody Square. In 1855, the community broke away from Danvers, and was incorporated as the independent town of South Danvers. The name was changed to Peabody on April 30, 1868, in honor of George Peabody, noted philanthropist born in present-day Peabody, widely regarded as the "father of modern philanthropy". It was granted city status in 1916. The western, less densely populated area of town is often separately, yet unofficially, referred to as West Peabody.

Peabody started off as a farming community, but its rivers and streams attracted mills which operated by water power. In particular, Peabody was a major center of New England's leather industry, which attracted immigrants from all around the world.

By 1915, a third of the population was born outside the United States. In addition to becoming home to large Irish and Russian populations, Peabody developed a large community of laborers hailing from the Ottoman Empire, mostly Turkish and Kurdish speakers from the region of Harput, now known as Elazığ. The population was situated primarily on Walnut Street, where they filled boarding houses and coffee houses to such an extent that it became known as "Ottoman Street," and, more pejoratively and less accurately, "Peabody's Barbary Coast", as the United States was at war with the Ottoman Empire during World War I. One visitor even noted that signs in town were written in both English and Ottoman Turkish.

On the morning of October 28, 1915, twenty-one young children were killed in the St. Johns School fire in the downtown area on Chestnut Street. The cause of the fire is believed to have been arson. Their bodies were found after the fire subsided, huddled together and burnt beyond recognition, near the entrance just steps away from survival. As a result, Peabody became the first city in the United States to establish a law that all entrances or exits in public buildings be push-open,
rather than by handle or knob.

The tanneries that lined Peabody's "Ottoman Street" remained a linchpin of the city's economy into the second half of the 20th century. The tanneries have since closed or been relocated elsewhere, but the city remains known locally as the Leather City or Tanner City. The mascot of Peabody Veterans Memorial High School is named the Tanners.

The loss of the tanneries was a huge blow to Peabody's economy, but the city has made up for the erosion of its industrial base, at least in part, through other forms of economic development. Early in the 20th century, Peabody joined the automobile revolution, hosting the pioneer Brass Era company, Corwin Manufacturing.

The Northshore Mall, originally known as the Northshore Shopping Center, is one of the region's largest shopping malls. The mall opened in September 1958 as an outdoor shopping center, and was built on farm land originally owned by Elias Hasket Derby, one of America's first millionaires. Centennial Park, an industrial park in the center of the city, has attracted several medical and technology companies. West Peabody, which was mostly farm land until the 1950s, has been developed into a middle-to-upper class residential area. Brooksby Farm, a  working farm and conservation area has been one of the city's most popular destinations for decades.

Peabody is also the location of the Salem Country Club, a privately owned country club with a professional golf course, which hosted the U.S. Senior Open in 2001 and 2017, and the U.S. Women's Open in 1954 and 1984.

Geography
Peabody is located at  (42.534045, −70.961465). The northwestern border of Peabody lies along the Ipswich River, with brooks feeding it, and the Waters River, a tributary of the Danvers River, drains the northeast part of town. Several other ponds and a portion of Suntaug Lake lie within town. The largest protected portion of the city is the Brooksby Farm, whose land includes the Nathaniel Felton Houses.

The city is wedge-shaped, with the city center located in the wider southeast end. The neighborhood of South Peabody lies south of it, and the more suburban neighborhood of West Peabody, where the high school is, lies to the northwest of the city center, separated by the highways and the Proctor neighborhood. Peabody is also bordered by Middleton to the northwest, Danvers to the north, Salem to the east, Lynn to the south and Lynnfield to the southwest.

Demographics

As of the census of 2010, there were 51,251 people living in the city and a total of 22,220 housing units. The racial makeup of the city was 90.4% White, 2.4% African American, 6.3% Hispanic or Latino of any race (1.3% Puerto Rican, 0.3% Mexican, 0.1% Cuban, and 4.5% other Hispanic or Latino), 1.9% Asian, 3.8% from other races, and 1.6% from two or more races.

The city has had a very large Greek  population ever since the early 20th century. Ever since the mid 20th century, the Portuguese population has been very present, especially from the Azores. In the 21st century, Brazilians came in large swathes.

There were 21,313 households, of which 26.8% included children under the age of 18, 48.4% were married couples living together, 10.7% had a female householder with no husband present, and 37.1% were non-families. Of all households, 31.4% were made up of individuals, and 16.3% had someone living alone who was 65 years of age or older. The average household size was 2.28, and the average family size was 3.02.

In the city, the population was spread out, with 21.1% under the age of 20, 22.5% from 20 to 39, 29.8% from 40 to 59,  and 26.5% who were 60 years of age or older. The median age of people in Peabody was 44.6. For every 100 females, there were 90.3 males. For every 100 females age 18 and over, there were 86.9 males.

The median income for a household in the city was $65,515, and the median income for a family was $80,471. Males had a median income of $55,352 versus $44,167 for females. About 4.4% of families and 6.3% of the population were below the poverty line, including 5.8% of those under age 18 and 7.9% of those age 65 or over.

In the April 2009 edition of Forbes magazine, Peabody was ranked the 14th most livable city in the United States.

Government
Peabody is represented in the state legislature by officials elected from the following districts:

 Massachusetts Senate's 2nd Essex district
 Massachusetts House of Representatives' 12th Essex district
 Massachusetts House of Representatives' 13th Essex district

Economy

 Major employers

 Analogic Corporation
 Boston Children's Hospital
 Boston Acoustics
 Carl Zeiss AG
 Christian Book Distributors
 JEOL
 Lahey Hospital & Medical Center
 Meridian Interstate Bancorp
 Northshore Mall
 Rousselot Gelatine (formerly a division of Kodak)
 Saucony
 UTC Aerospace Systems

Education 
 Peabody Veterans Memorial High School, a grade 9–12 public high school serving Peabody residents. The athletic teams are known as the Peabody Tanners. As of April 2008, there were 1,898 students enrolled in the school, and 146 teachers.
 Bishop Fenwick High School, a Catholic private high school serving the entire North Shore region, is located in the city near the boundary with Salem, Danvers, and Beverly. As of 2017, enrollment is just under 600 students.
 J. Henry Higgins Middle School, a grade 6–8 public middle school, with a hawk as its mascot.
 Covenant Christian Academy, a Christian and classical preparatory school for students Pre-K through 12th grade. Moved into the old John F. Kennedy Junior High School in West Peabody in 2005. They serve students from over 45 cities and towns in eastern Massachusetts.
 St. John The Baptist School, a private Catholic school that teaches up to grade 8. It currently has approximately 400 students.
 Peabody P.R.E.P. Personalized Remote Education Program

Public Elementary Schools 

  Captain Samuel Brown Elementary
  John E. Burke Elementary
  Thomas Carroll Elementary
  Center Elementary
  John E. McCarthy Elementary 
  South Memorial Elementary
  William A. Welch Elementary
  West Memorial Elementary

Infrastructure

Transportation
Peabody is the site of the large intersection of Interstate 95, Massachusetts Route 128, Massachusetts Route 129 and U.S. Route 1.  Route 1 heads north–south through the city as the main route between Boston and its northeast suburbs, and Route 129 is an east–west surface route that runs concurrently with Route 1 in the neighboring community of Lynnfield. I-95 and Route 128 share a 37-mile long concurrency as a half beltway around Boston, but in Peabody, the two highways split, with Interstate 95 going north into New Hampshire and Route 128 going east towards Gloucester and Cape Ann.  Massachusetts Route 114 passes through the northeast corner of town, going from Danvers towards Salem, with an intersection at Route 128's Exit 25, next to the Northshore Mall.  The southern terminus of Route 35 is at Route 114, just a half mile before Route 114 enters Salem.

Several lines of the MBTA bus service pass through town. The Logan Express also stops at the Northshore Mall in Peabody. The Springfield Terminal rail line passes through town, with one line passing from Lynnfield towards Danvers, and another, mostly abandoned, line passing from Middleton to Salem.  The nearest commuter rail service is in Salem, along the Newburyport/Rockport Line of the MBTA Commuter Rail, with service to Boston's North Station. The nearest airport is the Beverly Municipal Airport, and the nearest national and international air service is located at Boston's Logan International Airport.

Utilities
The municipally-owned Peabody Municipal Light Plant provides electricity to the city. Natural gas service in Peabody is provided by National Grid. Cable television in Peabody is provided by Comcast and the City in June 2019 issued a second Cable TV license to RCN.

Notable people

 Jeff Allison, former professional baseball pitcher for the Florida Marlins from 2003 to 2011
 Matt Antonelli, former second basemen for the San Diego Padres of Major League Baseball
 Samantha Arsenault, Olympic swimmer champion
 Garcelle Beauvais, actress and author
 Frederick Berry, disability rights advocate, state senator from 1983 to 2013, majority leader of the Massachusetts State Senate from 2003 to 2013
 Matt Bloom, professional wrestler
 Nathaniel Bowditch, early American astronomer, mathematician, and navigator
 Patrick Francis Bresnahan, United States Navy veteran, Medal of Honor
 Kimberly S. Budd, Chief Justice of the Massachusetts Supreme Judicial Court
 Bobby Carpenter, NHL player in the 1980s and 1990s
 Giles Corey, victim of the Salem witch trials
 Martha Corey, victim of the Salem witch trials
 Chick Davies, Major League Baseball player
 Brad Delp, lead singer of the band Boston
 Jerry DeLucca, former professional football player in New England Patriots
 Mary Upton Ferrin, American suffragette and women's rights advocate
 Bob Franke, singer-songwriter
 Gary Gulman, comedian
 Hrishikesh Hirway, musician, producer, host of Song Exploder , and vocalist of The One AM Radio
 Daniel P. King, congressman from 1843 to 1850
 Christina Kirkman, teen actress, comedian, and circus performer
 Joe Klein, author, journalist (worked for The Peabody Times in the 1970s)
 Steve Lomasney, former Major League Baseball player
 David A. Lowy, Associate Justice of the Massachusetts Supreme Judicial Court
 Heather MacLean, competitive runner; competed at 2020 Summer Olympics
 Nicholas Mavroules, mayor from 1967 to 1978, congressman 1979 to 1993
 Ryan Montbleau, professional musician
 Jonathan Mover, professional drummer
 George Peabody, merchant, philanthropist, and namesake of the city
  Marc Predka, rapper known as Tha Trademarc
 John Proctor, victim of the Salem witch trials
 Patricia Goldman-Rakic, pioneering neuroscientist and professor
 Ruth Shoer Rappaport, scientist and vaccine researcher
 Charles Rosa, MMA fighter
 Pauline Sperry, mathematician
 John J. Studzinski, Investment banker and philanthropist
 John Tudor, Major League Baseball pitcher from 1979 to 1990
 Rochelle Walensky, physician-scientist, director of the Centers for Disease Control and Prevention from 2021 to present
 Jack Welch, industrialist
 Nancy Werlin, book author

References

External links

 City of Peabody official website
 Peabody Historical Society
 Peabody Institute Library

 
1626 establishments in Massachusetts
Cities in Essex County, Massachusetts
Cities in Massachusetts
Populated places established in 1626